The city of Shanghai, China is one of the fastest-growing cities in the world in terms of skyscraper construction, with the City of Shanghai reporting at the end of 2004 that there had been 6,704 buildings of 11 stories or more completed since 1990. In 2011 there are over 20,000 buildings 11 stories or higher and  more than 1,000 buildings exceeding 30 stories in Shanghai.

Shanghai's first building boom occurred in the 1920s and 1930s, during the city's heyday as a multinational center of business and finance. The city's international concessions permitted foreign investment, and with it came architectural styles from the West, as seen today in areas such as the French Concession and the Bund. After the Communist takeover in 1949 the city's development was stifled, punished for its earlier capitalist excesses. After economic reforms beginning in the 1980s, the city is undergoing its second construction boom to fulfill its desire to regain its status as an important global financial center.

It is currently the tallest building in the People's Republic of China and the third tallest in the world.

Tallest buildings
This includes spires and architectural details but does not include antenna masts. An equals sign (=) following a rank indicates the same height between two or more buildings. The "Year" column indicates the year in which a building was completed.

* Indicates still under construction, but has been topped out.

Tallest under construction, approved, and proposed

Under construction
This lists buildings that are under construction in Shanghai and are planned to rise at least . Buildings that have already been topped out are also included.

* Table entries without text indicate that information regarding floor counts, and/or dates of completion has not yet been released.

Approved

This lists buildings that are approved for construction in Shanghai and are planned to rise at least .

* Table entries without text indicate that information regarding floor counts, and/or dates of completion has not yet been released.

Proposed

This lists buildings that are proposed for construction in Shanghai and are planned to rise at least .

* Table entries without text indicate that information regarding floor counts, and/or dates of completion has not yet been released.

Timeline of tallest buildings

This lists buildings that once held the title of tallest building in Shanghai when measured to roof (excluding spire, but including clock tower in the case of the Customs House). When measured to height of structural or architectural top, the Shanghai Exhibition Centre (at 110.4 metres tall to top of spire) held the title from completion in 1955 until overtaken by the Jin Jiang Tower in 1988.

See also

 List of cities with most skyscrapers

Notes

 A. The Oriental Pearl Tower is not a habitable building, but is included in this list for comparative purposes. Per a ruling by the Council on Tall Buildings and Urban Habitat, freestanding observation towers are not considered to be buildings, as they are not fully habitable structures.

References

External links
 
 Diagram of Shanghai skyscrapers on SkyscraperPage

Shanghai
Tallest buildings